C/1865 B1 (Great Southern Comet of 1865) was a non-periodic comet, which in 1865 was so bright that it was visible to unaided-eye observations in the Southern Hemisphere. The comet could not be seen from the Northern Hemisphere.

Discovery and observations
The comet was a naked-eye discovery on January 17 by Francis Abbott in Hobart, Tasmania. The comet was independently discovered by Robert L. J. Ellery in Melbourne and observers in South Africa, Chile and Brazil. In addition to Abbott and Ellery, John Tebbutt in Windsor, New South Wales, Carl Wilhelm Moesta (1825–1884) in Santiago, C. C. Copsey in São João del Rei, and William Mann (1817–1873) at the Cape of Good Hope made telescope observations of this comet. At the first observations, the comet’s tail had a length of from 10° to 12°.

Before its discovery, the comet reached its perihelion and its closest approach to planet Earth. From its discovery and through the end of January the comet was visible, in the Southern Hemisphere, to the naked eye. Ellery in Melbourne described the comet as “not nearly so bright” as Donati’s Comet. The maximum length reported for the tail was 25° on January 21. At the end of January the tail's length was about 17°.

In the Southern Hemisphere, the comet was visible to the naked eye for the entire month of February. At the beginning of March, the tail was barely ½° and soon the comet could be observed only by telescope. William Mann at the Cape of Good Hope successfully observed the comet through April and until May 2.

On 24 January, the comet reached its maximum brightness of magnitude 1.

Orbit
Using observations of the comet over 102 days, Felix Körber was able to calculate only a parabolic orbit, inclined to the ecliptic by about 92°. The comet reached its perihelion of approximately 0.026 AU on January 14 and then on January 15 its closest approach to planet Earth of approximately 0.94 AU. On January 16 the comet passed by Venus at a distance of approximately 0.67 AU.

Tebbutt's summary
In the section of his Astronomical Memoirs entitled 1865, Tebbutt wrote:

References

Non-periodic comets
18650117